Duyster is a Dutch surname. Notable people with the surname include:

 Willemijn Duyster (born 1970), Dutch field hockey player
 Jeroen Duyster (born 1966), Dutch rower
 Willem Cornelisz Duyster (1599–1635), Dutch painter
 

Dutch-language surnames